Melbourne University Publishing (MUP) is the book publishing arm of the University of Melbourne. The press is currently a member of the Association of University Presses.

History
MUP was founded in 1922 as Melbourne University Press to sell text books and stationery to students, and soon began publishing books itself. Over the years scholarly works published under the MUP imprint have won numerous awards and prizes. The name Melbourne University Publishing was adopted for the business in 2003 following a restructure by the university, but books continue to be published under the Melbourne University Press imprint. The company's mandate is expressed by the tag line, "Books with Spine", which was coined by the writer Guy Rundle when Louise Adler asked him for a suitable motto.

The Miegunyah Press is an imprint of MUP, established in 1967 under a bequest from businessman and philanthropist Russell Grimwade, with the intention of subsidising the publication of illustrated scholarly works that would otherwise be uneconomic to publish. Grimwade's great-grandnephew Andrew Grimwade is the present patron. Miegunyah is from an Aboriginal Australian language, meaning "my house".

MUP also is the current publisher of the literary journal Meanjin.

Directors
1922–1932: Stanley Addison
1932–1942: Frank Wilmot
1943–1962: Gwyn James
1962–1988: Peter Ryan
1989: Brian Wilder
1990–1994: John Iremonger
1994: Andrew Watson (Acting)
1994–1996: Brian Wilder
1996–2002: John Meckan
2002–2019: Louise Adler
2019–current: Nathan Hollier

See also
 List of university presses

References

Further reading

External links
 

Australian companies established in 1922
Book publishing companies of Australia
University of Melbourne
University presses of Australia
Publishing companies established in 1922